Summerton Bog is a bog in Marquette County, Wisconsin. The bog provides a habitat for several rare species of plantlife and wildlife. It is owned by The Nature Conservancy and contains . The bog was designated a Wisconsin State Natural Area in 1966 and a National Natural Landmark in 1973.

References

External links
Summerton Bog Official website

Protected areas of Marquette County, Wisconsin
National Natural Landmarks in Wisconsin
Nature Conservancy preserves
Bogs of Wisconsin
Landforms of Marquette County, Wisconsin
State Natural Areas of Wisconsin